The Ascent of Little Lilian is a 1925 German silent film directed by Fred Sauer and starring Maria Zelenka, Bruno Kastner and Georg Baselt.

The film's art direction was by Julian Ballenstedt.

Cast

References

Bibliography

External links

1925 films
Films of the Weimar Republic
Films directed by Fred Sauer
German silent feature films
Bavaria Film films
German black-and-white films